The second season of the Indonesian reality talent show The Voice Indonesia premiered February 26, 2016 on the RCTI network in the 9:00 p.m, slot immediately following Tukang Bubur Naik Haji The Series. This is the first aired by RCTI, after the previous broadcaster Indosiar dropped the show after its first one season due to poor ratings. Television personality and Indonesian Idol host Daniel Mananta was appointed as the show's new host, with Ari Lasso, Agnez Mo, Kaka "Slank", and Judika selected as coaches. Coach Ariel "Noah" served as an advisor for all teams during the knockout rounds. The winner of the knockout rounds received a 1 billion rupiahs recording contract with Universal Music Indonesia and a Toyota Yaris AT. The show aired Fridays and Saturdays at 9:00 p.m. Starting on April 1, the show aired every Friday at 9:00 p.m.

On June 20, 2016, Mario G. Klau from Team Kaka "Slank" was announced as the winner.

Auditions 

The open call auditions were held in the following locations:

Format 
The series consists of four phases:

The Blind Auditions 
Four judges/coaches, all famous musicians, choose teams of contestants through a blind audition process. Each judge has the length of the contestants' performance to decide if he or she wants that singer on his or her team; if two or more judges want the same singer then the singer chooses which coach they want to work with.

Battle round 
Each team of singers was mentored and developed by their coach. In the second stage, the coaches have two of their team members battle against each other by singing the same song, with the coach choosing which team member will advance to the next stage. However, the contestant who loses the battle round can be stolen by other coach. Like the Blind auction, If two or more coaches attempt to steal a single contestant, the contestant chooses which coach they will work with.

Knockout round 
Like the battle round, each team of singers was mentored and developed by their coach prior to the round beginning. The Knockout Round determines which three artists from each team will advance to the final round of competition, the Live Shows. In this round, after an artist performs, he or she will sit in one of three seats above the stage. The first three artists performing from each team will sit down, but once the fourth artist performs, the coach has the choice of replacing the fourth artist with any artist sitting down, or eliminating them immediately. Once all artists have performed, those who remain seated will advance to the Live Shows.

Live performance shows 
In the final phase, the remaining contestants will compete against each other in live broadcasts. The television audience will help to decide who moves on. When one team member remains for each coach, the contestants compete against each other in the finale, where the winner is selected.

Teams 
Color Key

Blind auditions 
The blind auditions were filmed in Studio 8 RCTI from January 17 to January 20, 2016. The first episode of the blind auditions premiered on February 26, 2016.
Colour key

Episode 1 (February 26)

Episode 2 (February 27)

Episode 3 (March 4)

Episode 4 (March 5)

Episode 5 (March 11)

Episode 6 (March 12)

Episode 7 (March 18)

Episode 8 (March 19)

Episode 9 (March 25)

The Battle rounds 
The battle rounds were filmed in Studio 8 RCTI on February 26, 2016. The first four-hour episode was broadcast on March 26, 2016. 'Steals' were introduced this season, where each coach could steal two contestants from another team if they lost their battle round.

After the blind auditions, each coach had 19 (Ari Lasso) or 20 (Kaka, Agnez Mo and Judika) contestants for the battle rounds, which aired starting March 26, until April 8. Anastasya Ratih from Team Agnez Mo withdrew from the competition due to pregnancy.
Colour key

The Knockouts 
The knockout rounds were filmed in Studio 8 RCTI between March 29 and 30, 2016. After the battle round, each coach had 12 contestants for the Live Shows. The knockout round follows the new format of three-chair challenge introduced in the Dutch version of the show. For the knockouts, Ariel "Noah" was assigned as a mentor for contestants in all four teams. Gloria Maria from Team Judika withdrew from the competition due to health issues.

Color key:

Live shows 
The live shows are the final phase of the competition. The shows were filmed at the Studio 8 RCTI, Jakarta.

Color key:

Week 1: Top 24 Group A (May 13)

Week 2: Top 24 Group B (May 20)

Week 3: Live Playoff 1 (May 27)

Week 4: Live Playoff 2 (June 3)

Week 5: Semifinals (June 10) 
Semifinals held on 20:30, due to be aired at 22:30 on UEFA Euro 2016 will show the opening ceremony and opening match between France and Romania, where the RCTI become the official broadcasting rights.

The four finalists were originally from the same team (Team Agnez).

Week 6: Finals (June 20) 
Especially for this Spectacular, held on Monday, June 20, 2016 for the June 17, 2016, will show the UEFA Euro 2016 match between Italy-Sweden and Czech Republic-Croatia.

Elimination chart

Overall 
Color key
Artist's info

Result details

Team 
Color key
Artist's info

Result details

Contestants who appeared on other talent shows 

 Rayfida from R.Sister previously auditioned for Mamamia Show (season 4) in 2014 where she was eliminated at Top 8.
 Dewi Kisworo, Mervo, Benny Tophot, M. Aziz, and Rifany Maria (Soulmotion) previously auditioned for Rising Star Indonesia in 2014.
 M. Habib, Janita Gabriella, Natasya Misel, Rani Klees, Daniel Ferro, Irwan Saputra, Ario Setiawan, Julivan, Jansen Daniel, Gok Parasian (Gogoi) and Rizki Jonathan - Andry Fernando (2RF) previously auditioned for X Factor Indonesia in 2015.
 Intan Rahayuning and Febrina Fransisca previously auditioned for Indonesian Idol in 2014.
 Vanessa Axelia, Sekar Teja, and Novita Kusumawardhani previously auditioned for NEZacademy in 2013.
 Chaerunnissa previously auditioned for Mamamia Show (season 3) in 2010 where she was eliminated at Top 5.
 Gloria Maria previously auditioned for Cherrybelle Cari Chibi in 2012 where she was eliminated at Elimination 1.
 Astrid Caecilia previously auditioned for Indonesia Mencari Bakat (season 3) in 2012 where she was eliminated at Semi Finals.
 After failing to make a team, Prince Husein auditioned for Just Duet. He was eliminated at elimination.
 Helmi Muhammad, who failed to turn a chair in the blind auditions, auditioned for the second season of Q Academy.
 Mawar Sari previously auditioned for Asia Bagus in 1998.

See also 
 The Voice Indonesia
 The Voice Indonesia (season 1)
 19th Annual Panasonic Gobel Awards

References

External links
 Official website

2016 Indonesian television seasons
Season 2